Dinesh Phadnis (born 2 November 1966) is an Indian television actor. He is better known for playing the character of Fredericks in one of the longest running TV shows, C.I.D.

Apart from working as an Inspector in this TV series, he has also written some of the episodes of C.I.D. He also appeared in the Bollywood film Sarfarosh and Super 30. He has also written for a Marathi film. He lives in Shantivan, Borivali East.

Filmography

Television

References

External links

Indian male television actors
Indian male comedians
Living people
1966 births